Tawny Banh (born December 12, 1974) is an American table tennis player. She competed at the 2000 Summer Olympics and the 2004 Summer Olympics.

References

External links
 

1974 births
Living people
American female table tennis players
Olympic table tennis players of the United States
Table tennis players at the 2000 Summer Olympics
Table tennis players at the 2004 Summer Olympics
People from Bạc Liêu Province
Pan American Games medalists in table tennis
Pan American Games gold medalists for the United States
Pan American Games silver medalists for the United States
Pan American Games bronze medalists for the United States
Table tennis players at the 1995 Pan American Games
Table tennis players at the 1999 Pan American Games
Table tennis players at the 2003 Pan American Games
Table tennis players at the 2007 Pan American Games
Medalists at the 1995 Pan American Games
Medalists at the 1999 Pan American Games
Medalists at the 2003 Pan American Games
Medalists at the 2007 Pan American Games
21st-century American women
20th-century American women